The 2018–19 Saigon Heat season is the team's 7th season in the ASEAN Basketball League (ABL).

Roster

Standings

Results

References

2018–19 in Vietnamese basketball